Aleksandar Stoyanov Teodorov-Balan was a Bulgarian linguist, historian and bibliographer.

Balan was born in the village of Kubey in the Russian Empire, today in Odessa Oblast, Ukraine, to a Bessarabian Bulgarian family. The Bulgarian general Georgi Todorov was his brother. Balan studied in Prague and Leipzig graduating in Slavistics from the Charles University in Prague. In 1884 he settled in Sofia, the capital of the Principality of Bulgaria, spending four years working for the Ministry of Popular Enlightenment. He became professor of Slavic ethnography and dialectology and history of the Bulgarian language, since 1893 head of the Bulgarian and Slavic literature department of the High Pedagogical School (the future Sofia University). On 29 January 1889, he was elected the first rector of the university and reelected several times (1896–1897, 1902–1903); he was also dean of the Faculty of History and Philosophy (1899–1900, 1904–1905).

In the late 19th and early 20th century, he was secretary of the Bulgarian Academy of Sciences, and from 1939 on he was doctor honoris causa of the Sofia University, as well as an active member of the Bulgarian Academy of Sciences. From 1907 to 1910 he was also the head secretary of the Bulgarian Exarchate. Aleksandar Teodorov-Balan was also among the founders of the tourist movement in Bulgaria, a long-standing chairman of the Bulgarian Tourist Association and editor of the Bulgarian Tourist magazine. In addition, he was also Grand Master of the Grand Masonic Lodge of Bulgaria.

Works 
Among his most important scientific contributions ranks his work on Bulgarian grammar, the peculiarities of Bulgarian phonology, his struggle against loanwords (linguistic purism), the enrichment of the language using dialectal words. He also published works in the field of literary history. Some of his publications (including posthumous) include:

 A study on Slavonic-Bulgarian History, Plovdiv, 1898
 Sophronius of Vratsa, Sofia, 1906
 Cyril and Methodius. Passionals, Sofia, 1920
 New Bulgarian grammar, Sofia, 1940
 Struggle for modern orthography (1921-1923), Sofia, 1924
 New Bulgarian grammar for everyone, Sofia, 1958
 Selected works, Sofia, 1987
 A book about myself, Sofia, 1988

Balan's scientific legacy amounts to 886 titles, including books, studies, articles and notes, of which 310 devoted to the Bulgarian language, as well as many successful neologisms. Despite his numerous contributions, Balan lived in relative poverty, with his French wife often suffering from tuberculosis. Balan survived to almost centenarian age, he died in Sofia on 12 February 1959.

Memory 
Balan Ridge on Alexander Island in Antarctica is named after Aleksandar Balan, as is the Sofia Metro's Akademik Aleksandar Teodorov - Balan Metro Station in the Mladost district.

Notes

References
 
 
 Веселинов, Д., А. Ангелова, Ст. Пинтев. Александър Теодоров-Балан. Книжевни залиси. Книгопис (лична библиография). Хроноложки показалец на статии, бележки, вести, оценки и книги. София, Университетско издателство „Св. Климент Охридски“, 2011, 228 с. ISBN 978-954-07-3005-9

1859 births
1959 deaths
People from Odesa Oblast
Bessarabian Bulgarians
Charles University alumni
Linguists from Bulgaria
20th-century Bulgarian historians
Academic staff of Sofia University
Members of the Bulgarian Academy of Sciences
Dialectologists
Bulgarian Freemasons
Rectors of Sofia University
19th-century Bulgarian historians